Ben Jolley (born 12 February 1986) is an Australian rules footballer currently playing for Port Melbourne in the Victorian Football League.

A midfielder from the Calder Cannons, Jolley was picked up by the Essendon Football Club as a rookie in 2005. He played a total of four AFL games for Essendon before being cut by the club at the end of the 2006 season. He then continued his football career with the Bendigo Bombers, Essendon's , and then moved to Williamstown where in 2010 he finished third in the J. J. Liston Trophy, awarded for the VFL best and fairest.

After retiring from the Seagulls at the conclusion of the 2018 VFL season, Jolley signed with Williamstown's oldest and fiercest rivals, Port Melbourne, for 2019.

References
 

1986 births
Living people
Essendon Football Club players
Australian rules footballers from Victoria (Australia)
Strathmore Football Club players
Williamstown Football Club players
Bendigo Football Club players
Port Melbourne Football Club players